Designated in 1991, the Chesapeake Bay National Estuarine Research Reserve - Virginia (CBNERR-VA) is one of 29 protected areas that make up the National Estuarine Research Reserve System (NERRS).  Established to promote informed management of the nation's estuaries and coastal habitats, national estuarine research reserves inspire solutions for healthy coasts and maintain strong local economies, effectively functioning as America's bridge between freshwater and salt.

Located in the southern subregion of the Chesapeake Bay, the nation's largest estuary, CBNERR-VA is a steward of four unique reserves that protect a diversity of estuarine habitat: Sweet Hall Marsh, Taskinas Creek, Catlett Islands and the Goodwin Islands.  This multi-component system is situated along the York River's salinity gradient, making CBNERR-VA the foremost authority on York River estuarine habitat and water quality.

CBNERR-VA is administered as a partnership between the Commonwealth of Virginia and the National Oceanic and Atmospheric Administration (NOAA), while managed on a daily basis by the Virginia Institute of Marine Science (VIMS). As such, its research informs local, state and national policy.  As a leader in regional estuarine coastal education, CBNERR-VA builds capacity among current and future decision makers, resource stewards and voters.

Mission 
The mission of CBNERR-VA is to exhibit leadership in coastal zone management through innovative estuarine and coastal watershed science and education programs that promote natural resource stewardship and science-based solutions to complex socioecological challenges.

To fulfill its mission, CBNERR-VA advances scientific understanding of watershed and estuarine systems, conducts education and training programs, conserves coastal resources, and provides advisory service through two topical areas of focus that holistically address local, regional and national issues; they include:

 Coastal response and mitigation to environmental change, and
 Water quality monitoring and assessment to address aquatic life and societal needs.

The reserve's mission complements the three-part mission of VIMS to conduct interdisciplinary research in coastal ocean and estuarine science, educate students and citizens, and provide advisory service to policy makers, industry and the public.

Related Links 

 Virginia Estuarine and Coastal Observing System (VECOS)
 Chesapeake Bay Interpretive Buoy System (CBIBS)
 National Estuarine Research Reserve System (NERRS)
 National Estuarine Research Reserve System Centralized Data Management Office (CDMO)

References
Chesapeake Bay National Estuarine Research Reserve (Virginia) (VIMS site)
Chesapeake Bay National Estuarine Research Reserve (Virginia) (NOAA site)

Protected areas of Virginia
National Estuarine Research Reserves of the United States
Protected areas established in 1991
1991 establishments in Virginia